Federal Office for Transport (Bundesanstalt für Verkehr, BAV) is a government agency of Austria. Its head office is Vienna. It is subordinate to the Ministry for Transport, Innovation and Technology.

A part of this agency is the Federal Safety Investigation Authority (SIA; ; SUB). The SIA is an independent authority to investigate accidents and incidents in the fields of civil aviation, railway, cablecars and shipping.

Investigations
 Hapag-Lloyd Flight 3378

References

External links

 Federal Office for Transport
 Federal Office for Transport 

Austria
Aviation in Austria
Government of Austria
Transport organisations based in Austria